Maria Adelaide Sneider (6 December 1937 – 1 May 1989) (also known as Maria Adelaide Sneider Ludovici, her second surname being "Ludovici") was an Italian mathematician working on numerical and mathematical analysis. She is known for her work on the theory of electrostatic capacities of non-smooth closed hypersurfaces: Apart from the development of precise estimates for the numerical approximation of the electrostatic capacity of the unit cube, this work also led her to give a rigorous proof of Green's identities for large classes of hypersurfaces with singularities, and later to develop an accurate mathematical analysis of the points effect. She is also known for her contributions to the Dirichlet problem for pluriharmonic functions on the unit sphere of ℂn.

Work

Selected works
.
. An accurate analysis of the problem of calculation of capacitances of surfaces with singularities.
, is an analysis of the numerical performance of several one–dimensional quadrature formulas.
.
.
. A work presenting a complete interdisciplinary analysis of the stability of a system of ordinary differential equations containing a large number of parameters, modeling a biological system.
.
. is Maria Adelaide Sneider's conclusive work on the Dirichlet problem for pluriharmonic functions on a ball in the complex euclidean space.
.

See also
Harmonic polynomial
Potential theory

Notes

References

General references
, is a collection of papers, published in issues 3 and 4 of the 10th volume, and partly on the 1st issue of the 11th volume of the seventh series of the "Rendiconti di Matematica e delle sue Applicazioni" mathematical journal as an homage to her memory.
. The brief "Introduction" written for the double issue of the "Rendiconti di Matematica" dedicated to Maria Adelaide Sneider.
. An obituary on Maria Adelaide Sneider, including a detailed sketch of her major research contributions and a full list of her publications.
.

Scientific references
 of the memoir : A short but accurate report on the work, offered as a motivation for its publication in the Lincean series of memoirs.
. An English updated and expanded translation of the memoir .
.
. (See here  for a preprint version available from the Author's website, retrieved on 1 May 2009). An expository paper detailing the contributions of Gaetano Fichera and his school, including Maria Adelaide Sneider, on the problem of numerical calculation of eigenvalues for general differential operators.

External links
. The entry about Maria Adelaide Sneider at the Edizione Nazionale Matematica Italiana.

1937 births
1989 deaths
People from Asmara
University of Trieste alumni
Academic staff of the Sapienza University of Rome
20th-century Italian mathematicians
Complex analysts
Mathematical analysts
Numerical analysts